Olethreutes arcuella, the arched marble, is a colorful small moth species of the family Tortricidae.

Synonyms
Junior synonyms of this species are:
 Olethreutes arcuellus (lapsus)
 Phalaena arcuana Linnaeus, 1761
 Phalaena arcuella Clerck, 1759
 Phalaena lambergiana Scopoli, 1763
 Tortrix arcuana (Linnaeus, 1761)

Distribution
This species can be found in most of Europe, in the eastern Palearctic realm, and in the Near East.

Habitat
These moths inhabit woodland, fields, hill pasture and heaths.

Description

Olethreutes arcuella has a wingspan of 14–18 mm. Forewings of these medium size moths have an orange-rufous ground colour, with some yellow patches, a few metallic blue-grey or silver-colored streaks and a wide black marking in the middle, which includes a row of three small, silver colored spots. The hindwings are brown. The caterpillars are purplish- gray to violet-brown  and have a yellowish-brown head.

This species is quite similar to Olethreutes subtilana, but has rather narrower wings.

Biology
This species usually has one generation (univoltine). The flight time of these day-active moths ranges between late May and August. The caterpillars feed on dead and dried out leaves and similar plant material. Also pupation takes place in plant debris.

Bibliography
  (2009): Online World Catalogue of the Tortricidae – Olethreutes arcuella. Version 1.3.1. Retrieved 2010-APR-19.
  (2005): Markku Savela's Lepidoptera and some other life forms – Olethreutes arcuellus [sic]. Version of 2005-SEP-16. Retrieved 2010-APR-19.
  (1942): Eigenartige Geschmacksrichtungen bei Kleinschmetterlingsraupen ["Strange tastes among micromoth caterpillars"]. Zeitschrift des Wiener Entomologen-Vereins 27: 105-109 [in German]. PDF fulltext

References

External links

  Waarneming.nl 
 Svenska fjärilar 
 Papillon de Poitou-Charentes 
 Lepiforum
 Natur-lexikon

Moths described in 1759
Tortricidae of Europe
Insects of Turkey
Taxa named by Carl Alexander Clerck